The Belize National Teachers Union is a national union of education professionals based in Belize. It was formed from a merger of two similar unions in the 1960s. The Teachers Union has gotten into several confrontations with national governments over cost of living increases versus salaries and benefits.

It is affiliated with the Caribbean Union of Teachers and the National Trade Union Congress of Belize.

Trade unions in Belize
Education in Belize
Caribbean Congress of Labour
Education trade unions

Trade unions established in the 1960s